Minoru Kojima (born 11 October 1968) was the original guitarist for Japanese experimental punk band The Mad Capsule Markets. He is also known as Scene or Shin Murohime, which is apparently a conglomeration of characters from the names of different Boøwy members. He started The Mad Capsule Markets (which at the time was  called Berrie) in 1985, with vocalist Hiroshi Kyono, in an attempt to create "loud, punk music" after becoming "bored" with music played on television and radio. After the release of Mad's Humanity, Minoru left the band and was replaced by "support guitarist" Ai Ishigaki. In 1991 Minoru started Die in Cries and in 1994 became a member of The Bloody Imitation Society. Over the years Minoru worked with more bands and even went solo for a short time before returning to Mad to play on "Good Day" from their album 010 and playing on their "Cistm Konfliqt" tour.

Minoru also involves himself in co-arranging music for other artists including Tetsuya and Chieko Kawabe. He has also played guitar on Aikawa Nanase's album 7 Seven and her mini album R.U.O.K.?! alongside former hide with Spread Beaver members - I.N.A., K.A.Z, Chirolyn, D.I.E, "Crazy" Cool Joe from Dead End and Pata from X Japan. He is also a member of Bug, with his former Die in Cries bandmate and D'erlanger front man, Kyo. Minoru currently performs with the band Spin.

Discography

Berrie

The Mad Capsule Markets

Optic Nerve

Die in Cries

Bloody Imitation Society

Bug

External links
Official Website 
Web site for new Kojima Minoru/Murohime Shin Band

1968 births
Living people
Visual kei musicians
Japanese punk rock musicians
Japanese rock guitarists
Punk rock guitarists
The Mad Capsule Markets members
20th-century Japanese guitarists
21st-century Japanese guitarists